Iinuma (written: 飯沼) is a Japanese surname. Notable people with the surname include:

, Japanese aviator
, Japanese samurai
, Japanese botanist and physician

See also
Iinuma Station, a railway station in Nakatsugawa, Gifu Prefecture, Japan

Japanese-language surnames